The Schodack Subdivision is a railroad line owned by CSX Transportation in the U.S. state of New York. The line runs from Stuyvesant north to Schodack along a former New York Central Railroad line. At its south end, it merges with the Hudson Subdivision; its north is at a junction with the Berkshire Subdivision, and the Castleton Subdivision at the east end of the Alfred H. Smith Memorial Bridge.

History
The entire Schodack Subdivision was opened in 1924 by the Hudson River Connecting Railroad as part of a bypass around Albany. The line became part of the New York Central Railroad and Conrail through leases, mergers, and takeovers, and was assigned to CSX Transportation in the 1999 breakup of Conrail.

See also
 List of CSX Transportation lines

References

CSX Transportation lines
Rail infrastructure in New York (state)
New York Central Railroad lines
1924 establishments in New York (state)